Itä-Pakila (Finnish), Östra Baggböle (Swedish) is a northwestern neighborhood of Helsinki, Finland.

Neighbourhoods of Helsinki